Donald Trump, a Republican originally from New York, who during his presidency moved his principal residency to Florida, was elected President of the United States on November 8, 2016. He was inaugurated on January 20, 2017 as the nation's 45th president, and his presidency ended on January 20, 2021 with the inauguration of Joe Biden. The following articles cover the timeline of Trump's presidency, and the time leading up to it:

 Pre-presidency: 2015–2017
 Donald Trump 2016 presidential campaign
 Presidential transition of Donald Trump
 Presidency: 2017
 First 100 days of Donald Trump's presidency
 Timeline of the Donald Trump presidency (2017 Q1)
 Timeline of the Donald Trump presidency (2017 Q2)
 Timeline of the Donald Trump presidency (2017 Q3)
 Timeline of the Donald Trump presidency (2017 Q4)
 Presidency: 2018
 Timeline of the Donald Trump presidency (2018 Q1)
 Timeline of the Donald Trump presidency (2018 Q2)
 Timeline of the Donald Trump presidency (2018 Q3)
 Timeline of the Donald Trump presidency (2018 Q4)
 Presidency: 2019
 Timeline of the Donald Trump presidency (2019 Q1)
 Timeline of the Donald Trump presidency (2019 Q2)
 Timeline of the Donald Trump presidency (2019 Q3)
 Timeline of the Donald Trump presidency (2019 Q4)
 Presidency: 2020–2021
 Timeline of the Donald Trump presidency (2020 Q1) 
 Timeline of the Donald Trump presidency (2020 Q2)
 Timeline of the Donald Trump presidency (2020 Q3)
 Timeline of the Donald Trump presidency (2020 Q4–January 2021)

See also
 Timeline of the Barack Obama presidency, for his predecessor
 Timeline of the Joe Biden presidency, for his successor

 
Trump
Presidency of Donald Trump